Marie-Agnès Labarre (born 12 June 1945) is a former member of the Senate of France, who represented the Essonne department. She is a member of the Communist, Republican, and Citizen Group. She is a member of the Left Party, prior to which she was a member of the PS. In November 1999, Labarre was elevated as a Chevalier in the Ordre national du Mérite.

References

  Page on the Senate website

1945 births
Living people
Socialist Party (France) politicians
Left Party (France) politicians
French Senators of the Fifth Republic
Knights of the Ordre national du Mérite
Women members of the Senate (France)
21st-century French women politicians
Senators of Essonne